Ettarraz Mosque, is a Tunisian mosque located in the west of the medina of Tunis.

Localization
The mosque can be found in the Sidi Ben Arous Street.

Description
Ettarraz Mosque was built in 1836, during the reign of the Husainid dynasty, after an order of the emir Mustapha Ben Mahmoud Ben Mohamed El Rachid according to the plaque on the facade. It was restored in 1982.

References 

Mosques in Tunis
19th-century mosques